The Titanic Museum Attraction is a museum located in Branson, Missouri on 76 Country Boulevard. It is one of two Titanic-themed museums owned by John Joslyn (who headed a 1987 expedition to Titanic's final resting place); the other is located in Pigeon Forge, Tennessee. The museum holds 400 pre-discovery artifacts in 20 galleries.

Guests step through the artificial iceberg into the museum, and receive a passenger boarding ticket, featuring the name of an actual Titanic passenger and the class on which the passenger traveled. During the tour, guests learn the individual stories of several passengers. At the end of the tour, guests are told whether their ticket holder survived.

Like the museum of Pigeon Forge, the museum's main exterior visual feature is the partial mockup of the original ocean liner. The construction consists of the front half of the ship, including its first two funnels.

In a 2017 episode of the Travel Channel series, Ghost Adventures, Zak Bagans and the crew investigated the museum due to claimed paranormal activities that were apparently traced to actual relics from the shipwreck.

See also
Sinking of the RMS Titanic
List of maritime museums in the United States

External links

 Titanic Museum Attraction Website

References

Landmarks in Missouri
Museums in Branson, Missouri
Maritime museums in Missouri
RMS Titanic
Museums established in 2006
2006 establishments in Missouri

es:Branson (Misuri)#El Museo Titanic